The Anauá River is a river of the state of Roraima in northern Brazil. It is a tributary of the Branco River. In the Tupi language Anauá translates to flowering tree.

See also
List of rivers of Roraima

References

Rivers of Roraima